Clyo is an unincorporated community in Effingham County, Georgia, United States. Clyo has a post office with ZIP code 31303.

History
"Tuckasee King", a former variant name of Clyo, served as Effingham County seat from 1784 until 1787. A post office called Clyo has been in operation since 1897. The community was named after Clio, the muse of history in Greek mythology.

References

Unincorporated communities in Effingham County, Georgia
Unincorporated communities in Georgia (U.S. state)